Robert Thomson (born January 28, 1982) is a Rwandan-American former basketball player currently playing for CS Gaz Metan Mediaş of the Romanian Basketball League. He is a member of the Rwanda men's national basketball team.

Born in Pennsylvania, Thomson graduated from Saucon Valley High School in Hellertown, Pennsylvania. He played college basketball at Fairfield University.

Thomson moved to Rwanda in 2006 after graduating from Fairfield and playing two years of professional basketball in Hungary and Italy.  Thomson later received a Rwandan passport and was a member of the Rwanda team that finished ninth at the 2009 FIBA Africa Championship and the 2007 that qualified for the first African championship in Rwandan history. Thomson led all players in rebounds and minutes per game at the 2009 tournament.

Awards and accomplishments

Club
U Cluj-Napoca
Liga Națională: (2011)

References

1982 births
Living people
Saucon Valley High School alumni
American emigrants to Rwanda
American men's basketball players
American people of Rwandan descent
CS Universitatea Cluj-Napoca (men's basketball) players
CSM Mediaș (basketball) players
Élan Béarnais players
Fairfield Stags men's basketball players
Rwandan men's basketball players
Centers (basketball)
Makedonikos B.C. players
Sportspeople from Northampton County, Pennsylvania